Karéri is a commune of the Cercle of Ténenkou in the Mopti Region of Mali. The main village and local government centre (chef-lieu) is Dioura. In 2009 the commune had a population of 28,414.

References

External links
.

Communes of Mopti Region